Sampirisi is a surname. Notable people with the surname include:

Jenny Sampirisi (born 1981), Canadian poet and writer
Mario Sampirisi (born 1992), Italian footballer